Bentley is a southern suburb of Perth, the capital city of Western Australia,  southeast of Perth's central business district. Its local government areas are the City of Canning and the Town of Victoria Park. Bentley is home to the main campus of Curtin University and Technology Park.

History
Prior to European settlement, the area was originally home to the Beeloo Nyungar people, whose territory extended from the Canning River to the Darling Scarp. The Beeloo hunted and fished in land close to the river, which was then forested with jarrah and marri trees, as much of the metropolitan area was at the time.  In 2001, the ABS reported that about 3% of Bentley's population were Aboriginal.

In 1830, the land was granted to James McDermott, and changed hands several times before being subdivided in 1885. The suburb was known as "Bentley Hill" from the 1860s onwards, honouring John Bentley (1822–1871), a prison warder and Crimean War veteran who arrived in the Swan River Colony as a pensioner guard, and supervised convicts building the then-Albany Road in 1862–1864. A large camp for the road workers was established in what is now St James.

In the 1880s, a dairy was established at "Canningford House" near the present-day intersection of Albany Highway and Leach Highway by Fred and Harry Liddelow, and in 1905 a piggery was established opposite.

In the 1940s, the State Housing Commission commenced urban residential development in the area. Housing was also provided by the government to reward former military servicemen for their efforts during the Second World War. Some of these modest war service homes remain today, a few are still occupied by ageing veterans. In 1960–1961, two large retirement housing complexes, Bentley Park (formerly Swan Cottage Homes) and Rowethorpe Homes, were built in the suburb's west and West Australian Institute of Technology (WAIT), later Curtin University, was opened in 1967.

In 1969–1970, the Brownlie Towers precinct was createdthe main feature of which was the twin 10-storey Brownlie Towers. Also included in the precinct were a smaller two-storey apartment complex, 104 two-storey townhouses and 20 single detached houses. Complete with a school, community centre, shopping area, swimming pool and sports facilities and linked to public transport, it was initially championed as a triumph of community building and innovative design by the State Housing Commission. However, social problems developed on and around the site, in part due to high vacancy rates and the public accessibility of the main towers. In 2002, the Government added the precinct to its "New Living" refurbishment program, which commenced at Brownlie Towers in 2004. Ultimately, the towers were demolished in 2019 to make way for the Bentley 360 residential development.

The Western Australian Technology Park was established opposite the university in 1985, and expanded in the 1990s. Over 90 companies, government departments and research groups with over 2,500 employees across a range of technological and scientific fields opened offices and research facilities at the park. It claims to contribute over $2 billion per annum to the Western Australian economy.

Population
In the 2016 Census, there were 8,782 people in Bentley. 33.6% of people were born in Australia. The next most common countries of birth were Malaysia 6.9%, China 6.3%, India 5.3%, England 4.1% and Indonesia 3.4%. 42.3% of people only spoke English at home. Other languages spoken at home included Mandarin 10.9%, Indonesian 3.5%, Cantonese 2.8%, Punjabi 1.8% and Other Southern Asian Languages 1.6%. The most common responses for religion were No Religion 25.2% and Catholic 15.6%.

Geography
Bentley is bounded by Kent Street to the west, Manning Road and Burton/Mills Streets to the south, Jarrah Road, Holder, Coolgardie and Tate Streets to the north and the Armadale railway line to the northeast. The section east of Albany Highway is largely commercial and industrial, while the area to the west bounded by Jarrah Road, Marquis Street, Cunning Road and Kent Street is dominated by environmental and cow grazing facilities. The rest is almost entirely residential.

Senior and tertiary education 

Bentley contains a university, further education colleges and a senior high school.

 Curtin University
 Morling College
 South Metropolitan TAFE
 Canning College

The presence of Curtin University, Canning College (originally Bentley High School, built 1960 and reopened 1982 as a college supporting adults returning to education, one of only four in the State) and the Bentley campus of Polytechnic West has attracted large numbers of fee-paying international students to the area, many of whom live in the suburb or in nearby parts of East Victoria Park, St James, Karawara and Waterford. In 2001 the ABS reported that 25% of Bentley's population are from East or South-East Asia.

Facilities
Bentley is an established suburb with schools, restaurants, a shopping centre (The Bentley Centre, formerly La Plaza Bentley), the Bentley Hospital, and a large retirement housing complex (Rowethorpe and SwanCare). Although it is predominantly a residential suburb, Bentley has a retail and light-industrial component in the areas adjacent to Albany Highway. It also contains the Boronia Pre-release Centre for Women, a minimum-security prison.

Transport
The suburb is served by a range of bus services, including the CircleRoute from Oats Street railway station and the Transperth 34 and 72 bus routes between Perth City and Cannington interchange. These services are operated by the Public Transport Authority.

Politics
Bentley is a mixed-class suburb which consistently favours the Australian Labor Party at both federal and state elections. The strongest results for Labor are recorded at the Bentley Community Centre booth adjacent to Brownlie Towers.

References

External links

 
Suburbs of Perth, Western Australia